Sheryl Scanlan (née Clarke; born 8 September 1977) is a New Zealand and Samoan international netball player. She played for the Northern Force in the National Bank Cup from 1998 until the conclusion in 2007, when the new ANZ Championship competition was announced, signing with the Northern Mystics for 2008.  In 2009 though she has changed sides, joining the Southern Steel. She has 72 international caps for the Silver Ferns currently from 2000–2009, and also played for Samoa from 1996–1999.

She retired from all netball after the 2012 season, after suffering many frustrating injuries.

Career highlights 
 1998 Commonwealth Games – Samoa 7th
 1999 Netball World Championships – Samoa: 8th
 2002 Commonwealth Games – New Zealand: Silver medal
 2003 Netball World Championships – New Zealand: Gold medal
 2006 Commonwealth Games – New Zealand: Gold medal
 2007 Netball World Championships – New Zealand: Silver medal

References

1977 births
Living people
New Zealand netball players
New Zealand international netball players
Commonwealth Games gold medallists for New Zealand
Commonwealth Games silver medallists for New Zealand
Netball players at the 2002 Commonwealth Games
Netball players at the 2006 Commonwealth Games
Commonwealth Games medallists in netball
2003 World Netball Championships players
2007 World Netball Championships players
Southern Steel players
Northern Mystics players
ANZ Championship players
Northern Force players
Netball players at the 1998 Commonwealth Games
Samoan netball players
Medallists at the 2006 Commonwealth Games